Mashhadi Sara (also Romanized as Mashhadī Sarā; also known as Mashhad Sar and Mashhad Sarā) is a village in Langarud Rural District, Salman Shahr District, Abbasabad County, Mazandaran Province, Iran. At the 2006 census, its population was 331, in 101 families.

References 

Populated places in Abbasabad County